The final of the Women's 200 metres Butterfly event at the European LC Championships 1997 was held on Sunday 24 August 1997 in Seville, Spain.

Finals

Qualifying heats

See also
1996 Women's Olympic Games 200m Butterfly
1997 Women's World Championships (SC) 200m Butterfly

References
 scmsom results
 La Gazzetta Archivio
 swimrankings

B